Edwardo Lao Rhodes (born 1946) is an American management science scholar and author. An Emeritus Professor at the Indiana University School of Public and Environmental Affairs, Rhodes is best known for his seminal work in data envelopment analysis, as well as his applications of management science to policy analysis and environmental policy.

Academic career 
Rhodes received a Bachelor of Arts at Princeton University in 1968 and a Ph.D. from Carnegie Mellon University in 1978 under the supervision of William W. Cooper. While he started his professional career at the State University of New York at Buffalo, Rhodes developed most of his career as a professor of the School of Public and Environmental Affairs at Indiana University where he reached the status of Professor Emeritus.

Research 
Rhodes is known for the invention of data envelopment analysis in 1978, as part of his doctoral dissertation, in the paper "Measuring the Efficiency of Decision Making Units" with William W. Cooper and Abraham Charnes.

After devoting several years to developing applications of management science to public policy and particularly to environmental policy, Rhodes wrote "Environmental Justice in America: A New Paradigm" in 2005. In the book, Rhodes discusses new methodological approaches to environmental justice and argues that race and class are relevant categories previously ignored in analyzing environmental justice issues.

References 

1946 births
Living people
Princeton University alumni
Carnegie Mellon University alumni
Indiana University faculty
Management scientists
American social scientists
American business theorists